Qara Darreh may refer to:
 Qara Darreh, Isfahan
 Qareh Daraq (disambiguation)